Bronwyn Drainie (born 1945) is a Canadian arts journalist. She was the editor-in-chief of  the Literary Review of Canada from 2003 to 2015. She has also been a columnist and book reviewer for The Globe and Mail. Drainie served as a host of programming on CBC Radio, including the flagship program Sunday Morning. She is the daughter of actors John Drainie and Claire Drainie Taylor.

Books

References

1945 births
The Globe and Mail columnists
CBC Radio hosts
Canadian literary critics
Women literary critics
Canadian magazine editors
Journalists from Toronto
Living people
Canadian women journalists
Canadian women radio journalists
Canadian women columnists
Women magazine editors
Canadian women radio hosts